Lewis James O'Brien (November 28, 1868 – June 14, 1955) was a provincial level politician and medical doctor from Alberta, Canada. He served as a member of the Legislative Assembly of Alberta from 1940 to 1944.

Early life
Lewis James O'Brien was born November 28, 1868 in Laskay, Ontario. He was educated in Toronto, served as a teacher, then returned to the University of Toronto where he completed his Bachelor of Arts in 1897. He obtained his Doctor of Medicine after enrolling at the University of Würzburg in Germany three years later. O'Brien remained in Germany and Austria for two years before moving back to Ontario to set up his medical practice and marry Alice John. During the First World War he served overseas with the Canadian Army Medical Corps at the 5th Canadian Hospital in Liverpool. O'Brien moved to the Peace Region after the war in 1918.

Political career
O'Brien ran as an Independent candidate under the Unity Movement in the 1940 Alberta general election. He defeated Social Credit incumbent MLA William Sharpe on the second count to win the Grande Prairie electoral district. O'Brien served a single term in the Assembly before announcing that he wanted to step off to the side lines and retire at a nomination convention held in the Capital Theater at Grande Prairie, Alberta on February 3, 1944.

Honours

References

External links

Lewis O'Brien First World War Service Record – Canadian Great War Project

 

Independent Alberta MLAs
University of Würzburg alumni
University of Toronto alumni
Physicians from Alberta
1868 births
1955 deaths
People from King, Ontario